Alphalpha may refer to:
Alfalfa, alternative spelling
Alphalpha Male, a music project of Don Kerr and Kevin Lacroix